is a professional Japanese baseball player. He plays infielder for the Hokkaido Nippon-Ham Fighters.

External links

 NPB.com

1990 births
Living people
Baseball people from Sapporo
Japanese baseball players
Nippon Professional Baseball infielders
Yomiuri Giants players
Hokkaido Nippon-Ham Fighters players